Bettina Wiesmann (born 20 October 1966) is a German politician of the Christian Democratic Union (CDU). Born in Berlin, she served as a member of the Bundestag from the state of Hesse from 2017 to 2021.

Political career 
Wiesmann became a member of the Bundestag in the 2017 German federal election. In parliament, she was a member of the Committee on Families, Senior Citizens, Women and Youth.

Political positions 
In 2019, Wiesmann joined 14 members of her parliamentary group who, in an open letter, called for the party to rally around Angela Merkel and party chairwoman Annegret Kramp-Karrenbauer amid criticism voiced by conservatives Friedrich Merz and Roland Koch.

References

External links 

  
 Bundestag biography 

1966 births
Living people
Members of the Bundestag for Hesse
Female members of the Bundestag
21st-century German women politicians
Members of the Bundestag 2017–2021
Members of the Bundestag for the Christian Democratic Union of Germany